Great Plains was a band from Columbus, Ohio active during the 1980s. Its vocalist and songwriter, Ron House, went on to found the much more successful band Thomas Jefferson Slave Apartments.

History
Great Plains was founded in 1981. Its first release was 1982's The Mark, Don & Mel EP, which contained eight tracks. In 1984, they released their full-length debut, Born in a Barn, on Homestead Records. They released another full-length, Naked At The Buy Sell & Trade, in 1986, followed by their third such album, Sum Things Up, in 1987. In 1989, the band released a compilation album, Colorized!, on the Demon Records offshoot Diabolo Records. In 2000, a compilation album of 50 of the band's songs from their entire career, entitled Length of Growth, 1981-1989, was released on the Old 3C label.

Reception
Robert Christgau awarded two of Great Plains' studio albums B+ grades, and the other (Sum Things Up) an A−. Len Righi described Sum Things Up as "an oddball combination of punk, pop, psychedelia, folk and garage rock" and said that the band's records had improved consistently in quality over their history.

Discography

Studio albums
Born in a Barn (Homestead) 1984
Naked at the Buy, Sell and Trade (Homestead) 1985
Sum Things Up (Homestead) 1987

EPs
The Mark, Don & Mel E.P. (New Age) 1983

Compilation albums
Colorized! (Diabolo, 1989)
Length of Growth 1981-89 (Old 3C) 2001

References

Musical groups from Columbus, Ohio
Musical groups established in 1981
Musical groups disestablished in 1989
Homestead Records artists
1981 establishments in Ohio
1989 disestablishments in Ohio